Mikheil Mchedlishvili (born 4 June 1979) is a Georgian chess grandmaster. He is a three-time Georgian Chess Champion.

Chess career
Born in 1979, Mchedlishvili won the Georgian Chess Championship in 2001 and earned his grandmaster title in 2002. He has since won the Georgian Championship in 2002 and 2018.

He has competed in six Chess Olympiads, the 35th and the 38th to 42nd.

He played in the Chess World Cup 2017, where was knocked out in the first round by Ernesto Inarkiev.

External links

Mikheil Mchedlishvili chess games at 365Chess.com

References

1979 births
Living people
Chess grandmasters
Chess Olympiad competitors
Chess players from Georgia (country)